Stanley William Kaluznick (August 2, 1931 – May 15, 2017) was a professional Canadian football player who played for the Winnipeg Blue Bombers and the Calgary Stampeders.

Kaluznick was born in Saint Boniface, Manitoba and resided in Calgary, Alberta after retiring from the CFL into a business career including the founding of United Mud Supply.

References

1931 births
2017 deaths
Canadian football people from Winnipeg
People from Saint Boniface, Winnipeg
Players of Canadian football from Manitoba
Winnipeg Blue Bombers players
Calgary Stampeders players